Beast is a 2022 survival action horror film directed by Baltasar Kormákur from a screenplay by Ryan Engle, based on a story by Jaime Primak Sullivan. The film stars Idris Elba, Iyana Halley, Leah Sava Jeffries, and Sharlto Copley. It follows a widowed father and his two teenage daughters who visit a South African game reserve but must fight to survive when they are stalked and attacked by a ferocious, rogue, man-killing lion.

Beast was released in the United States on August 19, 2022, by Universal Pictures. The film grossed $59 million worldwide on a $36 million budget and received mixed-to-positive reviews from critics.

Plot
Recently widowed Dr. Nate Samuels and his daughters, Meredith and Norah, arrive at the Mopani Reserve in South Africa for a vacation. Nate reunites with his old friend, Martin Battles, a biologist and Mopani manager, who introduced Nate and his wife. Martin takes Nate and the girls to the village where Nate's wife grew up. Nate confides to Martin his guilt over being distant following his and his wife's separation, after which she developed terminal cancer. The trip is to reconnect with his daughters.

The next day, Martin and the family tour the reserve's restricted areas. Martin shows them a local lion pride and notices that one is injured. At a nearby Tsonga community, Martin discovers most of the population is dead. Suspecting a rogue, man-killing lion is responsible, Martin rushes back to report the finding. Nate encounters an injured Tsonga man on the road but is unable to save him. Martin is mauled as he tracks the lion. It then ambushes Nate, who takes cover in the car. Meredith speeds away but crashes into a tree, stranding them.

Martin radios Nate on a walkie-talkie, warning him to stay away, saying the lion is using Martin as bait to lure the others out. As the radio is out of range to contact help, Nate assembles a tranquilizer rifle. He confronts the lion, hoping to subdue it long enough to recover Martin and trek back to civilization. The lion attacks, and Meredith takes advantage of the distraction to save Martin. Norah stabs the lion with a tranquilizer dart after it knocks the gun from Nate's hands, causing the lion to retreat. Meredith brings Martin back to the car, and Nate treats his wound.

As night falls, the now-recovering Martin speculates the lion went rogue after poachers killed its pride. Soon after, the poachers arrive and initially agree to transport the group to the village in exchange for payment. Tensions rise after the poachers spot Martin, an avid anti-poacher, inside the car. The lion attacks and scatters the poachers, killing most of them. Nate maneuvers his way past the lion and finds the poachers' truck keys. Back at the car, Martin holds the lion off long enough to allow the sisters to escape, though Meredith sustains a deep laceration to her side. The car falls into a ravine and Martin sacrifices himself by setting off an explosion from the leaking gasoline, severely burning the lion. Nate starts the truck and races away with Meredith and Norah but has to stop the car before they run out of fuel. They leave the car and walk to an abandoned schoolhouse nearby.

At the abandoned schoolhouse, which the poachers used as their base, Nate treats Meredith's wound and forages for water. The lion appears and stalks the girls, but Nate returns and scares it off. Locking his daughters inside a room, Nate promises to return after subduing the lion. After provoking the lion into chasing him, Nate lures it to the local lion pride which Martin helped raise. The rogue lion overtakes and mauls Nate, nearly killing him, until the pride males intervene and kill the rogue. A Mopani worker arrives and saves Nate as he falls unconscious.

Awakening in a hospital, a recovering Nate tells his daughters he loves them. Sometime later, the three return to the preserve, this time as a united family, and recreate the photo Nate's late wife took of herself next to her favorite tree.

Cast
 Idris Elba as Dr. Nate Samuels, a widowed father
 Iyana Halley as Meredith "Mare" Samuels, the elder daughter of Nate, who is rebellious and argumentative
 Leah Sava Jeffries as Norah Samuels, the younger daughter of Nate, who is more sensitive
 Sharlto Copley as Martin Battles, a wildlife biologist who is Nate's old friend.

Production
In September 2020, it was announced that Idris Elba would star in a new Universal Pictures film titled Beast, based on an original idea by Jaime Primak-Sullivan and directed by Baltasar Kormákur. In June 2021, Sharlto Copley, Iyana Halley, and Leah Sava Jeffries joined the cast.

Filming commenced on June 1, 2021, in South Africa and lasted for 10 weeks. Shooting occurred in the rural provinces of Namibia

Steven Price composed the film score. Back Lot Music has released the soundtrack.

Release
Beast was released on August 19, 2022, by Universal Pictures.

The film was released on VOD on September 8, 2022, followed by a Blu-ray and DVD release on October 11, 2022. The movie was released on Peacock on October 7, 2022.

Reception

Box office 
Beast grossed $31.8 million in the United States and Canada, and $27.3 million in other territories, for a worldwide total of $59.1 million, against a production budget of $36 million.

In North America, Beast was released alongside Dragon Ball Super: Super Hero and was projected to gross around $10 million from 3,743 theaters in its opening weekend. The film made $4.3 million on its first day, including $925,000 from Thursday night previews. It went on to debut at $11.6 million, finishing second behind Super Hero. The largest demographic was African-American at 34%, followed by 26% Caucasian, 23% Hispanic, and 10% Asian. Nearly half the opening weekend audience was over 35 years old, and a third was over 45. In its second weekend, the film made $4.9 million, finishing third.

Critical response 
On review aggregator Rotten Tomatoes, 68% of 206 reviews are positive, with an average rating of 6/10. The site's critics consensus reads, "Want to watch Idris Elba fight a lion? The admirably lean yet ultimately disposable Beast is just the movie you're looking for." Metacritic gave the film a weighted average score of 54 out of 100, based on 46 critics, indicating "mixed or average reviews". Audiences polled by CinemaScore gave the film an average grade of "B" on an A+ to F scale, while PostTrak gave the film a 65% overall positive score, with 46% saying they would definitely recommend it.

Several critics singled praise for cinematographer Philippe Rousselot. Wenlei Ma writing for news.com.au commended the film's focus: "it's a chase film and what you get is a suspenseful chase. Job done." Critic Dwight Brown wrote: "The success of this film's eye-catching, ear-grabbing hocus pocus can be traced back to smart direction, near seamless visual/sound effects, tight editing and the supremely talented Idris Elba." 

Odie Henderson of RogerEbert.com, gave it 2.5 out of 4 and compared the film to its contemporary, Prey (2022): "both have messages about hunters ravaging the animal kingdom and paying dearly for it [...]. The climactic showdown in both films boils down to the hero using what they know about their location and their foe, though this film requires a lot more suspension of disbelief." Richard Roeper called it "intermittently exciting but also quite dumb and ridiculous".

Accolades
The film was nominated for Outstanding Animated Character in a Photoreal Feature at the 21st Visual Effects Society Awards.

See also
 The Ghost and the Darkness (1996), an American historical adventure film 
 Prey (2007), a South African thriller film
 Rogue (2020), an American action thriller film

References

External links
 
 

2020s English-language films
2020s monster movies
2022 films
2022 horror films
2022 thriller films
American adventure films
Icelandic adventure films
American horror films
American survival films
American thriller films
Icelandic thriller films
South African thriller films
Films about father–daughter relationships
Films about lions
Films directed by Baltasar Kormákur
Films produced by Will Packer
Films scored by Steven Price
Films set in South Africa
Films shot in South Africa
2020s survival films
Universal Pictures films
Will Packer Productions films
2020s American films